The Super Series were exhibition ice hockey games between Soviet and North American teams from 1976 to 1991.

Super Series can also refer to:

Ice hockey
Super Series '76, played between Soviet teams and NHL teams
Super Series '76-77, played between the CSKA Moscow (Red Army) team and WHA teams
Summit Series, 1972 series known in certain sources as the Super Series
2007 Super Series, an ice hockey series between Russian and Canadian juniors
CHL Canada/Russia Series, known as the Subway Super Series from 2009-2014

Other sports
BWF Super Series, the Super Series of badminton
Grand Prix Super Series, category of men's tennis tournaments
ICC Super Series, the Super Series of cricket
PSA Super Series, the Super Series of squash
World Boxing Super Series, a boxing tournament featuring several world champions

See also
 Summit Series (disambiguation)